Friedrich Markgraf (1 February 1897 in Berlin-Friedenau – 8 March 1987 in Zurich) was a German botanist.

Life and work 
After secondary school, Markgraf studied biology at the Friedrich Wilhelm University Berlin. In 1922 he was awarded a Ph.D. for a thesis on the subject of a botanic-ecological study of the Bredower forest near Berlin.

After his habilitation he became first a professor of botany at the Friedrich Wilhelm University in Berlin and then at the Ludwig Maximilian University of Munich and director of the Botanical Garden Munich-Nymphenburg (1956-1958). Markgraf was also visiting professor of botany at the University of Zurich. During his teaching and research activities, he was primarily concerned with questions of botanical systematics, plant morphology and phytogeography and he also undertook research while travelling in the Mediterranean. In particular he made an important start on the study of the local flora of Albania. He acted as the Regional Adviser on Albania for Flora Europaea.

He was married to the botanist Ingeborg Markgraf-Dannenberg.

Publications 
 Die Bredower Forst bei Berlin, Dissertation, Friedrich-Wilhelms-Universität zu Berlin, 1922
 Kleines Praktikum der Vegetationskunde, 1926
 An den Grenzen des Mittelmeergebiete, 1927
 In Albaniens Bergen, 1930
 Pflanzen aus Albanien 1928, 1931
 Prodromus florae peninsulae Balcanicae / Fasc. 2. Dicotyledoncae Sympetalae 1928–1931, 1931
 Pflanzengeographie von Albanien, 1932
 Prodromus florae peninsulae Balcanicae / Fasc. 3. Monocotyle doucae 1932–1933, 1933
 Vegetationsstudien im Naturschutzgebiet Bellinchen, 1937
 Blumen der Alpen, co-author Josef Weisz, 1954
 Blumen der Berge, co-author Josef Weisz, 1954
 Formen des Lebens, 1957
 Illustrierte Flora von Mitteleuropa / Bd. 4. / T. 1, 2. Auflage, 1958–1963
 Mitteilungen aus dem Botanischen Museum der Universität Zürich / 219. Der morphologische Bau einer Merendera-Art der türkischen Steppe, 1962
 Führer durch die Freilandanlagen des Botanischen Gartens in München-Nymphenburg, 1966
 Repertorium specierum novarum regni vegetabilis / Beiheft Bd. 30. Prodromus florae peninsulae Balcanicae / Bd. 2. Dicotyledoneae sympetalae, Nachdruck 1970
 Repertorium specierum novarum regni vegetabilis / Beiheft Bd. 30. Prodromus florae peninsulae Balcanicae / Bd. 3. Monocotyledoneae, Nachdruck 1971
 Illustrierte Flora von Mitteleuropa / Bd. 1. Gymnospermae, Angiospermae / Teil 2, 1981

Sources
 Meyers Großes Personenlexikon. Mannheim 1968, page 857.
 Hermann Merxmüller, Walter Guttermann: "Eine neue Moehringien-Sippe aus den Südalpen. Professor Friedrich Markgraf zum 60. Geburtstag". In: Phyton: Annales rei botanicae. 30 April 1957.

References

20th-century German botanists
Scientists from Berlin
Academic staff of the Humboldt University of Berlin
Academic staff of the University of Zurich
1897 births
1987 deaths
People from Tempelhof-Schöneberg
German expatriates in Switzerland